Ghevont is an Armenian given name. Notable people with the name include:

 Ghevont Alishan, ordained Armenian Catholic priest, historian and a poet
 Ghevont Tourian, the primate of the Eastern Diocese of the Armenian Apostolic Church of America

Armenian masculine given names